Daniel Bauer may refer to:

 Daniel Bauer (footballer) (born 1982), German professional footballer
 Daniel Bauer (make-up artist) (born 1976), Australian make-up artist
 Daniel J. Bauer (born 1973), American statistician

See also 
 Bauer (surname)
 Daniel Baur (born 1999), Scottish footballer